Branko Savić (born 8 August 1972) is a Serbian football manager and former player.

Playing career
Savić started his senior career with Dinamo Pančevo, before moving to Proleter Zrenjanin in 1994. He was transferred to Partizan in the summer of 1997, alongside his teammate Milan Stojanoski. The duo would move to Israeli club Beitar Jerusalem in the summer of 2000, before returning to Partizan the next season. During his second spell with the Crno-beli, Savić helped the team qualify for the 2003–04 UEFA Champions League. He appeared in all six group stage matches. In 2004, Savić moved abroad for the second time by joining Chinese club Liaoning Zhongyu.

After returning to his homeland, Savić played for his former club Proleter Zrenjanin, Budućnost Banatski Dvor, as well as for newly formed Banat Zrenjanin.

Managerial career
Savić started his managerial career at Serbian League Vojvodina club Vršac in early 2015.

Honours
Partizan
 First League of FR Yugoslavia: 1998–99, 2001–02, 2002–03
 FR Yugoslavia Cup: 1997–98

References

External links
 

Association football defenders
Beitar Jerusalem F.C. players
Chinese Super League players
Expatriate football managers in Bosnia and Herzegovina
Expatriate footballers in China
Expatriate footballers in Israel
First League of Serbia and Montenegro players
FK Banat Zrenjanin players
FK Budućnost Banatski Dvor players
FK Dinamo Pančevo players
FK Modriča managers
FK Partizan players
FK Proleter Zrenjanin players
Israeli Premier League players
Liaoning F.C. players
Serbia and Montenegro expatriate footballers
Serbia and Montenegro expatriate sportspeople in China
Serbia and Montenegro expatriate sportspeople in Israel
Serbia and Montenegro footballers
Serbian expatriate football managers
Serbian expatriate sportspeople in Bosnia and Herzegovina
Serbian football managers
Serbian footballers
Serbian SuperLiga players
Sportspeople from Zrenjanin
1972 births
Living people